Rig Sefid (also Romanized as Rīg Sefīd and Rīg Safīd; also known as Rīg Asbī, Fatḩābād, and Fatḩābād-e Bālā) is a village in Zagheh Rural District, Zagheh District, Khorramabad County, Lorestan Province, Iran. At the 2006 census, its population was 59, in 16 families.

References 

Towns and villages in Khorramabad County